Santuk is a district within Kampong Thom Province, in central  Cambodia. According to the 1998 census of Cambodia, it had a population of 58,434. Santuk Silk Farm and Phnom Santuk lie in the district.

Administration 
The following table shows the villages of Stueng Saen Municipality by commune.

References 

Districts of Kampong Thom province